Prestonia is an unincorporated community in Ozark County, Missouri, United States. The Prestonia site lies on a ridge above East Pidgeon Creek and is southwest of Howards Ridge. The Missouri-Arkansas border is approximately one mile to the south and Norfork Lake is about four miles to the east. Access is from Missouri Route J via county road J529.

History
A post office called Prestonia was established in 1891, and remained in operation until 1913. The community was named after one Mr. Preston, the proprietor of a local mill.

References

Unincorporated communities in Ozark County, Missouri
Unincorporated communities in Missouri